BBC Focus on Africa was a quarterly magazine established in 1990, based in London, UK, and available widely in Africa and in English-speaking countries globally. The magazine covered news, politics, economics, social events, culture and sport, and had access to correspondents based across Africa. The last edition was published in October 2012, making it the last BBC World Service magazine to close down after London Calling and On Air.

References

External links
 Official website

1990 establishments in the United Kingdom
2012 disestablishments in the United Kingdom
BBC publications
News magazines published in the United Kingdom
Quarterly magazines published in the United Kingdom
Defunct magazines published in the United Kingdom
Magazines established in 1990
Magazines disestablished in 2012
Magazines published in London